This page summarises the Australia men's national soccer team fixtures and results in 2021.

Summary
The 2022 World Cup and 2023 AFC Asian Cup qualification matches were postponed from 2020 to 2021 as a result of the ongoing COVID-19 pandemic. Australia had also accepted an invitation to participate in the 2020 Copa América as a guest nation, but this competition was also postponed to 2021, and Australia subsequently withdrew.

Australia played half of the qualifiers in the second round of the qualifiers for the 2022 World Cup and the 2023 Asian Cup in 2019. Following these four matches, they sat first place in the group having won all the matches, scoring 16 goals and conceding only one goal to Chinese Taipei. The remaining matches were postponed due to the COVID-19 pandemic in Asia and rescheduled to be played in June 2021 in Kuwait as a centralised venue.

On 3 June, Australia played their first match after 567 days without playing, beating Kuwait 3–0 in the Asian qualifiers. Acting captain Mathew Leckie headed in the opener, Jackson Irvine scored the second from a rebound of a saved penalty, and Ajdin Hrustic scored the third from a free kick. The game also had 3 national team debutants, with Fran Karacic starting the match and Kenny Dougall and Riley McGree being substituted on from the bench. Four days later, Australia beat Chinese Taipei, marking six consecutive victories for the first time in 20 years. In the first half Harry Souttar and captain Trent Sainsbury headed goals either side of Jamie Maclaren's penalty and Mitchell Duke scored a brace in the second half either side of Chinese Taipei's goal, scored by Gao Wei-jie. In the game Denis Genreau, Connor Metcalfe, and Ruon Tongyik were handed their international debuts. Four days later, Australia extended their winning streak to seven consecutive victories, marking the first time in 24 years, beating Nepal 3–0 and securing the top place in their group. In the first half Leckie scored a header before assisting Karacic's maiden international goal and in the second half Martin Boyle scored the third goal before Lawrence Thomas was substituted on to make his international debut. After another four days, Australia beat Jordan 1–0 thanks to a header by Souttar. This win marked the first time in history that they won eight consecutive matches in a World Cup campaign.

After finishing top of the group in the second and qualifying for the 2023 AFC Asian Cup, in the last few months of the year, Australia began the third round of the qualifiers for the 2022 World Cup. On 2 September, Australia "hosted" China at a neutral venue in Qatar due to quarantine restrictions because of the COVID-19 pandemic in Australia. They won the match 3–0, with Awer Mabil, Boyle, and Duke scoring, while Callum Elder made his international debut. A few days later, Australia travelled to Vietnam where Rhyan Grant scored his first international goal to give Australia a 1–0 victory. It was their tenth consecutive win, which broke the record of the best run of form in the Asian Football Confederation. One month later, on 7 October, Australia beat Oman at a neutral venue in Qatar due to the quarantine restrictions. Mabil, Boyle, and Duke scored for Australia while Rabia Al-Alawi scored for Oman. It was their eleventh consecutive victory, breaking the world record for a run of form in World Cup qualification. A few days later, Australia's winning streak was broken when Japan beat them 2–1 at Saitama Stadium 2002. Ao Tanaka scored early for Japan, Hrustic equalised from a free kick, and Japan won due to an own goal by Aziz Behich near the end of the match. In November 2021, Australia played their first home game in over two years and were held to a scoreless draw by Saudi Arabia. Five days later, Australia played China again at a neutral venue in the United Arab Emirates with China the "host". In this fixture, the teams drew 1–1, with Duke heading home Australia's goal in the first half before Wu Lei equalised from the penalty spot during the second half.

Record

Match results

World Cup and Asian Cup qualifiers

Player statistics
Correct as of 16 November 2021 (v. ).
Numbers are listed by player's number in last match played

Notes

References

External links
 Australia: Fixtures and Results

Australia national soccer team seasons
2021 national football team results